Central Archives of Historical Records in Warsaw (AGAD) is one of Poland's four national archives. It holds records ranging from 12th century until World War I. The current headquarters is located in Raczyński Palace located at Długa 7 Street in Warsaw.

History
The archive was founded in 1808.

A large portion of the archive was intentionally destroyed by Nazi Germany during World War II in 1939 and in 1944. In the aftermath of the suppression of the Warsaw Uprising of 1944, the archives were not only deliberately set ablaze, but the Nazi German troops also entered each of the nine accessible fire-proof vaults in the underground shelter and meticulously burned one after another (entrance to the 10th was blocked by rubble, thus saving its contents).

Official names 
The archive went through several name changes:
National General Archive (Polish: Archiwum Ogólne Krajowe) (1808-1816)
Central Archives of the Polish Kingdom (Polish: Archiwum Główne Królestwa Polskiego) (1816-1889)
Warsaw Central Archive of Historical Records of the Polish Kingdom (Polish: Warszawskie Archiwum Główne Akt Dawnych Królestwa Polskiego) (1889-1918)
Central Archives of Historical Records (Polish: Archiwum Główne Akt Dawnych) (since 1918)

Archive Directors 
Walenty Skorochód Majewski (1808–1835) 
Feliks Bentkowski (1838–1852)
Walenty Hubert (1853–1875)
Adolf Pawiński (1875–1896)
Teodor Wierzbowski (1897–1919)
Stanisław Kętrzyński (1919–1920)
Józef Siemieński (1920–1939)
Adam Stebelski (1939–1953)
Michał Wąsowicz (1954–1976)
Kazimierz Krzos (1976–1979)
Mieczysław Motas (1979–1981)
Edward Potkowski (1981–1986)
Władysław Stępniak (1986–1997)
Hubert Wajs (from 1997)

See also 
Other three National Archives of Poland:
 Narodowe Archiwum Cyfrowe (English: National Digital Archive)
 Polish Central Archives of Modern Records (Polish: Archiwum Akt Nowych)
 Polish National Archive of Personal and Wage Documentation (Polish: Archiwum Państwowe Dokumentacji Osobowej i Płacowej)

Further reading

References 

Poland
Archives in Poland